Parmet is a Jewish surname derived from the Yiddish word "permentyon" (פּערמענטיאָן), meaning parchment.

The surname is most common in America, Eastern Europe, East Africa, The Netherlands, and the Dutch Argentine community.

Notable people with the surname include:

 Phil Parmet (born 1942), American cinematographer
 Herbert S Parmet (1929-2017), American historian and author
 Simon Parmet (1897-1969), Finnish composer[fi]
 Wendy Parmet, American author and professor of law.

References